is a railway station in Asahikawa, Hokkaidō Prefecture, Japan. Its station number is A32.

Lines
Hokkaido Railway Company
Sekihoku Main Line

Adjacent stations

References

Railway stations in Hokkaido Prefecture
Railway stations in Japan opened in 1922
Buildings and structures in Asahikawa